Eucalyptus terrica is a species of small tree that is endemic to south-eastern Queensland. It has thin, rough, fibrous bark on the trunk and larger branches, smooth bark above, lance-shaped adult leaves, flower buds in groups of seven, white flowers and hemispherical fruit.

Description
It has thin, rough, fibrous bark on the trunk, sometimes also on the larger branches, smooth grey to brown bark above. Flowering occurs from September to October and the flowers are white.

Taxonomy and naming
Eucalyptus terrica was first formally described in 1991 by Anthony Bean in the journal Austrobaileya from specimens collected near Gore in 1990. The specific epithet (terrica) is from the name of the station (Terrica Station) where the type material was collected.

Distribution and habit
This tree grows with other eucalypts in hilly country between Warwick and Inglewood in south-east Queensland.

Conservation status
This eucalypt is classified as "least concern" under the Queensland Government Nature Conservation Act 1992.

See also
List of Eucalyptus species

References

Trees of Australia
terrica
Myrtales of Australia
Flora of Queensland
Plants described in 1991